Of the nine species in the New Zealand parrot superfamily Strigopoidea, the Norfolk kaka and Chatham kaka became extinct in recent history. The last known individual of the Norfolk kaka died in its cage in London sometime after 1851, and only between seven and 20 skins survive. The Chatham kaka became extinct in pre-European times, after Polynesians settled the island, between 1550 and 1700, and is only known from subfossil bones.  Of the surviving species, the kakapo is critically endangered, with only  living individuals. The mainland kaka is listed as endangered, and the kea is listed as vulnerable. The Nestoridae genus Nelepsittacus consists of four extinct species.

Species list

Nestoridae
There are two surviving species and at least one well documented extinct species of the family Nestoridae. Very little is known about the Chatham kaka, and it may have been con-specific with another kaka species, or a separate species belonging to the genus.

Strigopidae
The kakapo is the only member of the family Strigopidae.

References

External links

Strigopidae